In chemical graph theory, the hyper-Wiener index or hyper-Wiener number is a topological index of a molecule, used in biochemistry. The hyper-Wiener index is a generalization introduced by Milan Randić
 of the concept of the Wiener index, introduced by Harry Wiener. The hyper-Wiener index of a connected graph G is defined by

 

where d(u,v) is the distance between vertex u and v.
Hyper-Wiener index as topological index assigned to G = (V,E) is based on the distance function which is invariant under the action of the automorphism group of G. 

Hyper-Wiener index can be used for the representation of computer networks and enhancing lattice hardware security. Hyper-Wiener indices used to limit the structure of a particle into a
solitary number which signifies the sub-atomic stretching
and electronic structures.

Example

One-pentagonal carbon nanocone which is an infinite symmetric graph, consists of one pentagon as its core surrounded by layers of hexagons. If there are n layers, then the graph of the molecules is denoted by Gn.
we have the following explicit formula for hyper-Wiener index of one-pentagonal carbon nanocone,

References

Graph invariants